Fish Lake is a high alpine lake (elevation approximately ) located in the Fishlake/ Southern Wasatch Plateau region of south-central Utah, United States. It lies within and is the namesake of the Fishlake National Forest.

Fish Lake, six miles long and one mile wide, lies in a geologic structure known as a graben valley. It is bounded by the Mytoge Mountains on the southeast shore which sharply rise about 1,000 feet (300 m) above the lake level. Along the northwest shore, the lake is bounded by Fish Lake Hightop Plateau (summit elevation 11,600 ft / 3,500 m).

Fish Lake holds rainbow trout, splake, lake trout, kokanee salmon, brown trout, tiger trout and yellow perch.  Yellow perch are regarded as an invasive species; there is no bag limit and anglers are encouraged to dispose of any yellow perch caught.  The lake is stocked by the Utah Division of Wildlife Resources fish hatchery in Glenwood.  The region sees heavy snowfall in the winter, with snowfall occurring as late as June in any given year.  For this reason tourist activity is at its peak in the summer months.

Pando, a clonal quaking aspen stand, that, according to some sources, is the oldest (80,000 years) and largest (106 acres, 13 million pounds) organism on Earth, is located 1 mile southwest of Fish Lake on Utah route 25.

The nearest town is Koosharem, 15 miles to the west (24 km).  A larger community, Richfield, is within a one-hour drive.

References

External links

 A guide to yellow perch fishing at Fish Lake
   by the Utah Division of Wildlife Resources
   by the Utah Department of Environmental Quality
 Fish Lake fishing
 

Fishlake National Forest
Lakes of Utah
Lakes of Sevier County, Utah